Martynovsky District is an administrative and municipal district (raion), one of the forty-three in Rostov Oblast, Russia. It is located in the center of the oblast. Its administrative center is the rural locality (a sloboda) of Bolshaya Martynovka. Population: 36,545 (2010 Census);  The population of Bolshaya Martynovka accounts for 16.9% of the district's total population.

References

Notes

Sources

Districts of Rostov Oblast